The 87th Infantry Division was an infantry division of the German Army during the Second World War, active from 1939 to 1945.

Operational history

The 87th Infantry Division was created on 26 August 1939 in Altenburg. The division went into captivity in the Courland pocket.

Commanders
Generalleutnant Bogislav von Studnitz (26 August 1939 – 16 February 1942; 1 March – 21 August 1942);
General der Artillerie Walther Lucht (17 – 28 February 1942);
Generalleutnant Werner Richter (22 August 1942 – 31 January 1943);
General der Artillerie Walter Hartmann (1 February – 21 November 1943);
Generalleutnant Mauritz Freiherr von Strachwitz (22 November 1943 – August 1944);
Generalleutnant Gerhard Feyerabend (August – September 1944);
Generalmajor Helmuth Walter (September 1944 – 15 January 1945);
Generalleutnant Mauritz Freiherr von Strachwitz (16 January 1945 – 10 May 1945).

Notes
Footnotes

Citations

References

0*087
Military units and formations established in 1939
1939 establishments in Germany
Military units and formations disestablished in 1945